North Muskham is a village and civil parish in Nottinghamshire, England, close to the border with Lincolnshire. The parish has a population of 943 (2001 census) with around 360 properties, increasing to 985 at the 2011 census.

St Wilfrid's Church is the parish church, a medieval building which is Grade I listed.  It was restored during 1906 and 1907.

There is currently one public house: 'The Muskham Ferry'.

History 
The village appears in the Domesday Book as Muscham in the hundred of Lythe.

North Muskham was a large ancient parish, which also included the villages of Bathley and Holme.  Until about 1575 the River Trent ran further east, but there was then a cataclysmic flood which changed the course of the river. Holme was therefore separated by the river from the rest of the parish.  In 1866 Holme and Bathley became separate civil parishes.

Between 1870 and 1872 John Marius Wilson's Imperial Gazetteer of England and Wales recorded the parish as having 194 houses with a real estate value of £5,161, with a manor belonging to Mr J. T. Edge.

Population 

In the 1801 census the parish of North Muskham (then including Bathley and Holme) had a population of 361. In 1861 according to official census records North Muskham had a total of inhabited permanent residences with a total population of 614 residents. In the 1911 census the parish was smaller (without Bathley and Holme), with an area of 1,203 acres and a population of 526 persons, 262 males and 254 females. The 1921 census saw the population drop with a total of 491 persons registered, but during the next decade the population increased very marginally to a total of 509. The 2001 census reports showed that the parish had a population of 943 with around 360 properties.

See also
 St. Wilfrid's Church, North Muskham
 South Muskham

References

External links

Official Parish Council Page of the village

Villages in Nottinghamshire
Civil parishes in Nottinghamshire
Newark and Sherwood